Astolfo Dutra is a Brazilian municipality located in the state of Minas Gerais. Its population  is estimated to be 14,270 people living in an elevation of 260 meters. The area of the municipality is 159.139 km². The city belongs to the mesoregion of Zona da Mata and to the microregion of Ubá.

See also
 List of municipalities in Minas Gerais

References

Municipalities in Minas Gerais